Kotagama may refer to:

Sarath Kotagama
Kotagama inscriptions